Perreux may refer to:

People
Thierry Perreux (born 1963), a French handball player

Places
 Perreux, Loire, a commune in the Loire département
 Perreux, Yonne, a former commune in the Yonne département
 Canton of Perreux, a former canton in Loire and Rhone-Alpes 
 Le Perreux-sur-Marne, a canton in the Val-de-Marne département
 Saint-Perreux, a canton in the Morbihan département